Northwest Indiana, nicknamed The Region after the Calumet Region, comprises Lake, Porter, LaPorte, and Newton counties in Indiana. This region neighbors Lake Michigan and is part of the Chicago metropolitan area. According to the 2020 Census, Northwest Indiana has a population of 831,080 and is the state's second largest urban area after the Indianapolis Metropolitan Area. It is also the home of the Indiana Dunes, parts of which have been preserved through conservation efforts. The town of Ogden Dunes houses the Hour Glass, a museum showcasing the ecological and conservation efforts of O. D. Frank.

The region's largest city is Hammond, followed closely by Gary. Other municipalities in Northwest Indiana include Burns Harbor, Chesterton, Crown Point, DeMotte, Dyer, East Chicago, Griffith, Highland, Hebron, Hobart, Kentland, Lake Station, La Porte, Lowell, Merrillville, Michigan City, Munster, Portage,  Schererville, St. John, Cedar Lake, Valparaiso, Whiting, and Winfield.

Overview 
Unlike the majority of Indiana, which operates on Eastern Standard Time, these counties are among six in Northern Indiana that are in the Central Time Zone (the other being Starke). This reflects their close economic integration in the Chicago metropolitan area.

Three counties — Lake, Porter and LaPorte — are served by the Northwestern Indiana Regional Planning Commission metropolitan planning organization. Northwest Indiana is the home of Marktown, Clayton Mark's planned worker community.

Geography 
The Lake Michigan shore is a major attraction.  Indiana Dunes National Park, which stretches from Gary to Michigan City, is a well-preserved stretch of sand dunes, beaches, grasslands, and forests, as well as several historical homes and buildings.
The terrain of Northwest Indiana varies from very steep and rugged at the dunes, to rolling in the moraines, and to pancake flat in the river valleys. It was shaped by glacial activity and Lake Michigan. The main geographical features of Northwest Indiana include the Valparaiso Moraine, Tinley Moraine, Lake Border Moraine, Iroquois Moraine, Calumet Shoreline, Glenwood Shoreline,  Tolleston shorelines, and the Kankakee Outwash Plain.

Chicago Lake Plain
The Chicago Lake Plain covers the relatively flat northern quarter of Northwest Indiana north of the moraines. Initially, the plain was flat, composed of glacio-lacustrine deposits.  These formed under the waters of glacial Lake Michigan.  The lake formed from the melting glaciers north of the Valparaiso Moraine. Eventually the lake overflowed a low spot on the moraine at the Chicago Outlet near the southwest suburbs.  This lowered the lake level to current day Lake Michigan levels (Horsley, 1986). As the lake shrunk, it left a series of sand ridges where its ancient beaches were. Along the Lake Michigan shoreline, the prevailing winds have built a series of dune ridges, breaking up the original flat surface of the Lake Plain.

Wheaton Morainal Plain 
 South of the Chicago Lake Plain in the central parts of Lake and Porter County and northern LaPorte county is the hilly Wheaton Morainal Plain. The Wheaton Morainal Plain consist of the Valparaiso Moraine and Tinley Moraine, paralleling the Lake Michigan Shoreline.  The plain consist of rolling Wisconsinan-age moraines. The Morainal Plain is clayey till, and sandy and loamy till, with areas of sand and gravel. Other deposits include lake clay, silt, and alluvium. Deposits are between 50 and 200 ft thick, with many southern areas have over 200 ft of till (Mades, 1987).

Kankakee Outwash Plain
The Kankakee Outwash Plain (southern Lake, Porter, and LaPorte counties) is a flat outwash plain formed by the melting glacier, which was stopped at the Valparaiso Moraine. (Mickelson and others, 1984). Deposits are predominantly sand and gravel, but also include alluvium and fill materials. Deposits average less than 200 ft thick; in the lowlands they can be less than 50 ft thick, while in the upland they can be more than 200 ft thick. Local elevation changes are less than 100 ft. and include many scattered sand dunes.

Bloomington Ridged Plain
The Bloomington Ridged Plain covers only the most southern part of Northwest Indiana in the valley of the Iroquois River in southern Newton and Jasper counties. This area consists of low and rolling hills, i.e., moraines like the Iroquois Moraine with less than 300 ft changes in elevation. The soils are loamy till, lake clay and silt.  Unlike the northern half of Northwest Indiana, the Huron-Erie glacial lobe left these deposits in its northeastward retreat. Deposits are less than 200 ft thick, with some more than 400 feet thick.

Economy 
With a gross domestic product of $28.64 billion in 2015, Northwest Indiana accounts for approximately nine percent of Indiana's gross state product. This figure ranks second among metropolitan areas in the state (after Indianapolis) and 89th in the United States, comparable to the GDP of the El Paso, Texas metropolitan area.

The northern portion of Northwest Indiana is noted for its heavy industry. Gary, Portage, Burns Harbor and East Chicago are home to major steel mills, including the largest North American facilities for both U.S. Steel (Gary Works) and Cleveland Cliffs (Indiana Harbor). Whiting and Hammond are home to the largest oil refinery in the Midwestern U.S., operated by BP. Other industrial outputs include fabricated metals, transportation equipment, and food products.

Since the 1990s, casino gambling has become a significant component of Northwest Indiana's economy. An additional  of gaming space is located in Michigan City.

Former Indiana Governor Mitch Daniels and the Indiana State Legislature formed the entity known as the Northwest Indiana Regional Development Authority (RDA) in 2006. The RDA, a special-purpose district, is vested with both legal authority and tax dollars to invest in transportation and economic development throughout the region.

A number of Northwest Indiana's suburban communities serve as bedroom communities for Chicago.

Education 
Colleges and universities located in Northwest Indiana include:

Calumet College of St. Joseph in Whiting
Indiana University Northwest (IU Northwest) in Gary
Purdue University Northwest, which encompasses the formerly named Purdue University Calumet campus in Hammond and the formerly named Purdue University North Central campus in Westville
Saint Joseph's College in Rensselaer- Closed in 2017, with plans to reopen as a junior college associated with Marian University (Indiana)
Valparaiso University in Valparaiso (the largest independent Lutheran University in the United States)
Hyles-Anderson College in Crown Point.

These institutions offer a variety of degree programs in fields such as business administration, engineering and engineering technology, law, education, computing and information technology, and the liberal arts. Additionally, Northwest Indiana is proximate to numerous other universities elsewhere in Indiana and in the Chicago metropolitan area.

A number of both public and private primary and secondary schools are also located throughout Northwest Indiana and the nearby Chicago metropolitan area.

Counties 
Lake County
LaPorte County
Newton County
Porter County

Census Bureau population statistics

Transportation

Major airports
Gary/Chicago International Airport (GYY) - No current scheduled air service
Midway International Airport (MDW)
O'Hare International Airport (ORD)
South Bend International Airport (SBN)

Commuter rail

South Shore Line connecting Chicago to South Bend, Indiana, passing through Gary and Michigan City

Highways
 Interstate 65
 Interstate 80
 Interstate 90 (Indiana Toll Road)
 Interstate 94
 U.S. Route 6
 U.S. Route 12
 U.S. Route 20
 U.S. Route 24
 U.S. Route 30
 U.S. Route 35
 U.S. Route 41
 U.S. Route 231
 U.S. Route 421
 Indiana State Road 2
 Indiana State Road 4
 Indiana State Road 8
 Indiana State Road 10
 Indiana State Road 14
 Indiana State Road 16
 Indiana State Road 39
 Indiana State Road 49
 Indiana State Road 51
 Indiana State Road 53
 Indiana State Road 55
 Indiana State Road 71
 Indiana State Road 104
 Indiana State Road 114
 Indiana State Road 130
 Indiana State Road 149
 Indiana State Road 152
 Indiana State Road 212
 Indiana State Road 249
 Indiana State Road 312
 Indiana State Road 520
 Indiana State Road 912

Area codes
219
574

Local media

Online
NWIndianaLife.com - Online

Print
The Times of Northwest Indiana - Print, Online
Post-Tribune - Print, Online
Region Sports Network - Print, Online, Broadcast
Chesterton Tribune - Print, Online
La Porte Herald-Argus - Print, Online
The News-Dispatch - Print, Online

Broadcast
WJOB (AM) 1230 - Radio
WLTH (AM) 1370 - Radio
WWCA (AM)  - Radio
WAKE 1500 - Radio
WIMS (AM) 1420 - Radio
WGVE-FM 88.7 - Radio
 WLPR-FM 89.1  - Radio
WEFM (FM) 95.9 - Radio
WXRD (FM) 103.9 - Radio
WLJE (FM) 105.5 - Radio
WZVN 107.1 - Radio
Regional Radio Sports Network - Radio
WYIN-TV - 56/17 Television
WJYS-TV - 62/36 Television

Notable people
Justin "The Beef" Bohannon

Omar Apollo
Anne Baxter
Larry Bigbie
Stephan Bonnar
Max Booth III
Frank Borman
Junior Bridgeman
Bob Chapek
Dick Cathcart
Jack Chevigny
Dan Dakich
Bryce Drew
Homer Drew
James Edwards
Jim Gaffigan
Freddie Gibbs
LaTroy Hawkins
Sue Hendrickson
Jack Hyles
Jackson family
Janet Jackson
Jermaine Jackson
La Toya Jackson
Marlon Jackson
Michael Jackson
Randy Jackson
Tito Jackson
Michael Joiner
Alex Karras
Ron Kittle
Bob Kuechenberg
Rudy Kuechenberg
Art LaFleur
Barney Liddell

Kenny Lofton
Lloyd McClendon
Karen McDougal
Karl Malden
Dale Messick
E'Twaun Moore
Hal Morris
Betsy Palmer
Mary Lou Piatek
Dan Plesac
Gregg Popovich
Gary Primich
Orville Redenbacher
Frank Reynolds
John Roberts
Glenn Robinson
Glenn Robinson III
Jerry L. Ross
Scott Sheldon
Kawann Short
Bobby Skafish
Tim Stoddard
Hank Stram
Dean White
Eugene Wilson
Jeff Samardzija
Jean Shepherd
Jo Anne Worley
Tony Zale

Parks and nature areas
 Biesecker Nature Preserve, St. John, Lake County
 Calumet Prairie Nature Preserve, Gary, Lake County
 Conrad Savanna Nature Preserve, Conrad, Newton County (black and white oak savanna)
 Fish Lake Wildlife Conservation Area, Fish Lake, LaPorte County
Gibson Woods Nature Preserve, Hammond, Lake County
Indiana Dunes National Park, Porter County
 Cowles Bog
 Pinhook Bog, LaPorte County
 Hoosier Prairie Nature Preserve, Griffith, Lake County
 Indiana Dunes State Park, Porter County
  Dunes Nature Preserve
 Ivanhoe Nature Preserve, Gary, Indiana
 Jasper-Pulaski Fish and Wildlife Area, Radioville, Pulaski County
 Kingsbury Fish and Wildlife Area, Kingbury, LaPorte County
 LaSalle Fish and Wildlife Area
 Stoutsburg Savanna Nature Preserve, Wheatfield, Jasper County (rolling sand ridges)
 Willow Slough Fish and Wildlife Area, Morocco, Newton County

References

 
Chicago metropolitan area
Regions of Indiana
Jasper County, Indiana
Lake County, Indiana
LaPorte County, Indiana
Newton County, Indiana
Porter County, Indiana
1884 establishments in Indiana